Eden Township is a township in Decatur County, Iowa, USA.  As of the 2000 census, its population was 279.

Geography
Eden Township covers an area of 36.17 square miles (93.67 square kilometers); of this, 0.03 square miles (0.09 square kilometers) or 0.1 percent is water. The streams of Britton Branch and McGruder Creek run through this township.

Unincorporated towns
 Blockly
(This list is based on USGS data and may include former settlements.)

Adjacent townships
 Center Township (north)
 High Point Township (northeast)
 Woodland Township (east)
 Morgan Township (southeast)
 Hamilton Township (south)
 New Buda Township (southwest)
 Burrell Township (west)
 Decatur Township (northwest)
 Leon Township (northwest)

Cemeteries
The township contains eight cemeteries: Bethel, Campbell, Chastain, County Home, Hatfield, Manchester, Meek and Mount Tabor.

Major highways
 U.S. Route 69

Climate
This region has significant seasonal temperature differences, going from warm summers to very cold winters.  There is precipitation year-round, and snowfall occurs in almost areas.  Most summer rainfall occurs during thunderstorms and a very occasional tropical system.  Area is only classified as humid because it is not dry enough to be classified as semi-arid or arid.

References

 U.S. Board on Geographic Names (GNIS)
 United States Census Bureau cartographic boundary files

External links
 US-Counties.com
 City-Data.com

Townships in Decatur County, Iowa
Townships in Iowa